Flagermusen is a 1966 Danish film directed by  and starring Poul Reichhardt.

Cast
In alphabetical order
 Annette Blichmann - Felicita, dancer and friend of Ida
 Lily Broberg - Rosalinde
 Poul Bundgaard
 Dario Campeotto
 Paul Hagen - Frosch
 Holger Juul Hansen - Dr. Falke
 Susanne Heinrich - Dancer and friend of Ida
 Knud Hilding
 Niels Hinrichsen
 Valsø Holm
 Arthur Jensen
 Dida Kronenberg - Dancer and friend of Ida
  - Prince Orloffsky
 Henry Nielsen
 Ghita Nørby - Kammerpige Adele
 Bjørn Puggaard-Müller
 Poul Reichhardt - Von Eisenstein
 Birgit Sadolin - Ida, Adeles Søster
 Ove Sprogøe - Advokat
 Karl Stegger - Fængelsdirektør
 Jeanette Swensson - Dancer and friend of Ida
 Olaf Ussing

External links

1966 films
1966 musical films
Danish musical films
1960s Danish-language films
Operetta films
Films based on operettas
Films set in the 1870s
Films set in Vienna